Stewart v Pettie, [1995] 1 SCR 131 is a leading decision of the Supreme Court of Canada on the duty of care owed by commercial establishments serving liquor.

Background
In December 1985, two couples, Gillian and Keith Stewart and Stuart and Shelley Pettie, went to a dinner theatre in Edmonton. At dinner Stuart was served a number of rum-and-cokes but showed no signs of intoxication. Afterwards the four discussed who should drive and Stuart insisted he was fit to drive, and so they agreed to let him drive. On the way back Stuart got them in an accident. Among the injuries, Gillian was rendered quadriplegic.

At trial the judge found that the dinner theatre could not have been aware of Stuart's degree of intoxication and did not impose liability based solely on the number of drinks served. On appeal the Court of Appeal overturned the decision and allocated 10% liability to the theatre. The court held that the Mayfield investments (owners of the theatre) did not breach the duty that they owed to Gillian Stewart.

Opinion of the Court
Justice Major, writing for the unanimous court, held that the theatre was not liable. Major J. examined the previous cases of Crocker v. Sundance Northwest Resorts Ltd. and Jordan House Ltd. v. Menow, finding that they confirmed the existence of a duty to third parties who are reasonably expected to pose a risk.

A breach of the duty is only where there was a foreseeable risk of harm. Here, there was no reasonable way that the theatre could foresee that Stuart would be the one to drive since he was accompanied by three individuals, two of them sober. The theatre was correct in assuming that Stuart would not be the one to drive. Nevertheless, Major confirmed that the theatre must monitor the patron's alcohol consumption based on the amount served and not solely on the patron's visible condition.

In an obiter dictum, Major mused that even if there was a breach of the standard of care, it was not clear if a warning by Mayfield would have resulted in a different choice of driver.

See also 
 Jordan House Hotel Ltd v Menow  [1974] S.C.R. 239
 Childs v Desormeaux [2006] 1 SCR 643
 List of Supreme Court of Canada cases (Lamer Court)

External links
 full text from CanLII

Canadian tort case law
Supreme Court of Canada cases
1995 in Canadian case law
Alcohol law in Canada